Room for Improvement may refer to:

 Room for Improvement (mixtape), a music compilation by Canadian artist Drake
 Room for Improvement (TV series), a 2003 Australian lifestyle television series